Henry John Pennifer (died 24 March 1918) was an English professional footballer who played as a half back in the Southern Football League for Queens Park Rangers. He also played semi-professionally for London League club Hampstead Town.

Personal life
Pennifer served as an appointed lance corporal in the 17th (Service) Battalion of the Duke of Cambridge's Own (Middlesex Regiment) during the First World War. Serving on the Western Front, he was killed in action near Pozières on 24 March 1918 and is commemorated on the Pozières Memorial.

Career statistics

References

Year of birth unknown
1918 deaths
Sportspeople from Stafford
Association football midfielders
English footballers
Southern Football League players
Hendon F.C. players
Queens Park Rangers F.C. players
British Army personnel of World War I
Middlesex Regiment soldiers
British military personnel killed in World War I
Military personnel from Staffordshire